Stilyaga is Russian derogatory term for a person and a subculture obsessed with fashion.

Stilyaga or Stilyagi may also refer to:

a nickname for Soviet LM-57 tramcar
 Stilyagi (film), a Russian comedy musical film about the subculture